The Design 1004 ship (full name Emergency Fleet Corporation Design 1004) was a wood-hulled cargo ship design approved for production by the United States Shipping Boards Emergency Fleet Corporation (EFT) in World War I. They were referred to as the "Peninsula"-type as all were built by the Peninsula Shipbuilding Company in Portland, Oregon. All ships were completed in 1918 or 1919. Ten ships were completed. The "Peninsula"-type were the only wooden-hull ships built with a turbine engine which was common on steel ships built at the same time.

References

External links
 EFC Design 1004: Illustrations

Standard ship types of the United States